is a Japanese comedy unit (kombi) consisting of two ,  and . Their name literally means "Vice manager, Section manager", and is a reference to the titles of two visitors at the bar in which they were working part-time before they were discovered by Yoshimoto. They were originally a three-man group with the name , or "Vice Manager, Section Manager, President", but after the third member of the group left, the name was reduced to its current version.

Kōmoto is the boke of the duo, and the much quieter Inoue is the tsukkomi. Both comedians are natives of Okayama. Inoue has a reputation among owarai geinin for being handsome, and he has scored high on Yoshimoto's "handsomest geinin ranking" for the last five years. Kōmoto is most famous for his strange faces and high-pitched character voices, although he is also a very talented singer, and is well respected by other owarai geinin for his skills. He is often heard squealing the line . In March 2003, Kōmoto married Naomi Shigemoto (former Osaka Performance Doll member), and they now have a son.

Kōmoto appeared in the NTV drama, 14-year-old Mother, playing the uncle of the 14-year-old pregnant girl. He is currently active in the idol group Yoshimotozaka46.

External links
 Yoshimoto Kōgyō official profile 
 

Japanese comedy duos
People from Okayama Prefecture